The Charlotte Church Show is a Channel 4 entertainment television show presented by Welsh singer Charlotte Church. It was first broadcast on 1 September 2006 and ran for six subsequent Fridays. The show was commissioned for a further two series, the first of which aired from 23 February to 6 April 2007. On 13 December 2006, Church won the Best Female Newcomer award for the show at the British Comedy Awards.

Each episode begins with a "theme tune" which always has the same melody and harmony, but is always in a unique style (reggae, country, disco, etc.). In the verse, Church sings about current events and gossip, and the chorus is simply "This is my lovely theme tune, it goes on and on."

Episode guide
Note: All guests not involved in a sketch or a hidden camera trick, are indicated in bold. (i.e. The guests mentioned during the opening credits)

Series 1

Series 2
Series 2 started on 23 February 2007 at 10pm on Channel 4 and lasted for 6 episodes. The second series had many changes compared to the first series, with a new theme tune, losing sketches such as "What We've Learnt This Week" and a much classier studio and sound.

Series 3
On 23 March 2007 a message was posted on the official Charlotte Church website to say that the series planned for summer 2007 has been put on hold until Church is ready to return to work after her pregnancy. In response to the delay of the third series Channel 4 doubled the number of episodes for the fifth series of The Friday Night Project.

It was announced on 10 February 2008 that Charlotte was ready to make her return to TV. Church herself confirmed on 26 March 2008 that the show would be back with the same format in summer 2008 as well as a Christmas special.

The series was moved to Thursday nights instead of Friday nights and began on 10 July 2008 with 2.4m viewers, matching the viewership that tuned in to the first episode of the second series.

Series 4
Church stated on The Paul O'Grady Show that there would be a Series 4, containing more music and entertainment as opposed to interviews. In 2010, she announced she would not return to the show, saying she did not enjoy the presenting side of it.

References

External links

Generation Charlotte Church - The Charlotte Church Show | Starring Charlotte Church

2000s British comedy television series
2000s British music television series
2000s British television talk shows
2006 British television series debuts
2008 British television series endings
Channel 4 comedy
British television talk shows